Works may refer to:

People
 Caddy Works (1896–1982), American college sports coach
 Samuel Works (c. 1781–1868), New York politician

Albums
 Works (Pink Floyd album), a Pink Floyd album from 1983
 Works, a Gary Burton album from 1972
 Works, a Status Quo album from 1983
 Works, a John Abercrombie album from 1991
 Works, a Pat Metheny album from 1994
 Works, an Alan Parson Project album from 2002
 Works Volume 1, a 1977 Emerson, Lake & Palmer album
 Works Volume 2, a 1977 Emerson, Lake & Palmer album
 The Works, a 1984 Queen album

Other uses
Good works, a topic in Christian theology 
 Microsoft Works, a collection of office productivity programs created by Microsoft
 IBM Works, an office suite for the IBM OS/2 operating system
 Mount Works, Victoria Land, Antarctica

See also 
 The Works (disambiguation)
 Work (disambiguation)